Amberomanga is a rural commune in Madagascar. It belongs to the district of Soavinandriana, which is a part of Itasy Region. The population of the commune was 8,772 in 2018.

Only primary schooling is available. The majority (97%) of the population of the commune are farmers, while an additional 1% receives their livelihood from raising livestock. The most important crop is maize, while other important products are cassava and rice. Services provide employment for 2% of the population.

References

Populated places in Itasy Region